James Price (born 1960) is a retired British boxer.

Boxing career
He represented England and won a gold medal in the 75 kg middleweight division, at the 1982 Commonwealth Games in Brisbane, Queensland, Australia.

Price was a southpaw and boxed for the Holy Name ABC in Fazakerley. He was the ABA light-middleweight champion in 1980 and the ABA middleweight champion in 1982.

He turned professional on 3 February 1983 and fought in 19 fights.

References

1960 births
Living people
British male boxers
Commonwealth Games medallists in boxing
Boxers at the 1982 Commonwealth Games
Commonwealth Games gold medallists for England
Middleweight boxers
Medallists at the 1982 Commonwealth Games